Kornie  is a village in the administrative district of Gmina Lubycza Królewska, within Tomaszów Lubelski County, Lublin Voivodeship, in eastern Poland, close to the border with Ukraine. The village is located in the historical region Galicia.

The village has a population of 140.

References

Kornie